The name Fabian has been used for four tropical cyclones in the Atlantic Ocean and six in the Western Pacific.

In the Atlantic:
 Tropical Storm Fabian (1985) – threatened no land.
 Tropical Storm Fabian (1991) – struck the Isle of Youth and mainland Cuba
 Tropical Storm Fabian (1997) – remained over the open ocean
 Hurricane Fabian (2003) – Category 4 hurricane, caused $300 million damage and four deaths after passing directly over Bermuda
Fabian was retired after the 2003 season and replaced with Fred in the 2009 hurricane season.

In the Western Pacific:
 Tropical Storm Fabian (1981) (T8123, 23W, Unsing) – struck Cam Ranh Bay, Vietnam
 Tropical Storm Fabian (1985) (T8501, 02W, Atring) – passed near the Yap Main Islands
 Tropical Storm Fabian (1988) (T8815, 12W) – did not impact land
 Tropical Storm Bebinca (2013) (T1305, 05W, Fabian) – brought minor damage in China and Vietnam
 Tropical Storm Roke (2017) (T1707, 10W, Fabian) – struck Hong Kong and Shenzhen
 Typhoon In-fa (2021) (T2106, 09W, Fabian) – made landfalls in the Putuo District of Zhoushan and Pinghu, China 

Atlantic hurricane set index articles
Pacific typhoon set index articles